Dombivli (Pronunciation: [ɖoːmbiʋliː]) is a city located on the banks of Ulhas River in Thane district of Maharashtra, India. It is part of Mumbai Metropolitan Region. It is also one of the busiest railway stations in the Mumbai Suburban Railway.

Geography
It has an average elevation of 13.534 meters (44.403 feet). The land here is rough and rocky by nature.

The climate is warm and humid.

Transportation

Dombivli is served by Mumbai Suburban railway network, i.e. it lies on the main line of the central section of Mumbai suburban railway network. Built in 1886, it is one of the busiest stations on the Central line and witnesses a footfall of more than 300 thousand commuters daily. Though none of the long journey express trains halt here, it is well connected to Mumbai and Navi Mumbai through Thane. Though during rush hours the station is an unacceptably over-crowded affair.

Education

G. R. Patil College

See also
Kalyan-Dombivli
Kalyan-Dombivli Municipal Corporation

References

External links
 Local Government site
 KDMC Website

Cities and towns in Thane district
Talukas in Maharashtra
Kalyan-Dombivli